is a series of interviews conducted by former Nintendo president and chief executive officer (CEO) Satoru Iwata from 2006 until his death in 2015. In these interview articles, Iwata discusses with various colleagues select details about Nintendo and other developers' video game titles, hardware, and various aspects of the company. The discussions reveal historical background information on the development of games and hardware as well as the mindset of the creators at the time. Additionally, these interviews often showcase the friendly camaraderie between Iwata and other members of Nintendo as jokes and laughter are shown to be commonplace. They proved to be one of the most insightful collections of information on the development of Nintendo products available. Times Matt Peckham referred to Iwata Asks as "a remarkable series" and "a Nintendophile's dream come true."

Content from Iwata Asks was featured in a book titled Ask Iwata: Words of Wisdom from Satoru Iwata, published by Hobonichi. The book was first published in 2019 in Japan, with its English translation being released in April 2021.

List of interviews

Wii series

Nintendo DS series

Nintendo 3DS series

Wii U series

Other interviews and specials

See also

List of Nintendo Direct presentations
Nintendo Network

Notes

References

External links
Iwata Asks segments
in Japanese
in English (UK version)

Nintendo events
Nintendo Network
Nintendo-related lists
Interviews
2000s-related lists
2010s-related lists